The 2007 World Wheelchair Curling Championship was held from February 17 to 24 at the Sollefteå Curling Club in Sollefteå, Sweden.

Qualification
 (Host country)
Top seven finishers from the 2005 World Wheelchair Curling Championship (not including host):
 
 
 
 

 
 
 Top teams from qualifying event:

Qualification event

Two teams outside of the top finishers, Russia and Japan, qualified from a qualifying event held in November 2007 in Inverness, Scotland.

Teams

Round-robin standings

Round-robin results

Draw 1
Saturday, February 17, 13:30

Draw 2
Saturday, February 17, 19:30

Draw 3
Sunday, February 18, 13:30

Draw 4
Sunday, February 18, 19:30

Draw 5
Monday, February 19, 13:30

Draw 6
Monday, February 19, 19:30

Draw 7
Tuesday, February 20, 13:30

Draw 8
Tuesday, February 20, 19:30

Draw 9
Wednesday, February 21, 13:30

Draw 10
Wednesday, February 21, 19:30

Draw 11
Thursday, February 22, 10:00

Draw 12
Thursday, February 22, 15:00

Tiebreakers

Fourth place classification
The winners move on to the playoffs semifinals.

Friday, February 23, 9:00

Eighth place classification
Friday, February 23, 9:00

Friday, February 23, 19:00

Playoffs

Semifinal
Friday, February 24, 19:00

Bronze medal game
Saturday, February 24, 10:00

Gold medal game
Saturday, February 24, 14:00

External links

Results at Wheelchaircurling.com

World Wheelchair Curling Championship
2007 in curling
2002 in Swedish sport
International curling competitions hosted by Sweden